Sarcocheilichthys is a genus of cyprinid fishes found in eastern Asia.  There are currently 12 species in the genus.

Species
 Sarcocheilichthys biwaensis K. Hosoya, 1982
 Sarcocheilichthys caobangensis V. H. Nguyễn & V. B. Vo, 2001
 Sarcocheilichthys czerskii (L. S. Berg, 1914) (Cherskii's thicklip gudgeon)
 Sarcocheilichthys davidi (Sauvage, 1878)
 Sarcocheilichthys hainanensis Nichols & C. H. Pope, 1927
 Sarcocheilichthys kiangsiensis Nichols, 1930
 Sarcocheilichthys lacustris (Dybowski, 1872)
 Sarcocheilichthys nigripinnis (Günther, 1873) (Rainbow gudgeon)
 Sarcocheilichthys nigripinnis morii D. S. Jordan & C. L. Hubbs, 1925
 Sarcocheilichthys nigripinnis nigripinnis (Günther, 1873)
 Sarcocheilichthys parvus Nichols, 1930
 Sarcocheilichthys sinensis Bleeker, 1871 (Chinese lake gudgeon)
 Sarcocheilichthys sinensis fukiensis Nichols, 1925
 Sarcocheilichthys sinensis sinensis Bleeker, 1871 
 Sarcocheilichthys soldatovi (L. S. Berg, 1914) (Soldatov's thicklip gudgeon)
 Sarcocheilichthys variegatus (Temminck & Schlegel, 1846)
 Sarcocheilichthys variegatus microoculus T. Mori, 1927
 Sarcocheilichthys variegatus variegatus (Temminck & Schlegel, 1846)
 Sarcocheilichthys variegatus wakiyae T. Mori, 1927

References
 

 
Fish of Asia
Freshwater fish genera
Ray-finned fish genera
Taxa named by Pieter Bleeker